Leo T is a dwarf galaxy situated in the Leo constellation and discovered in 2006 in the data obtained by Sloan Digital Sky Survey. The galaxy is located at the distance of about 420 kpc from the Sun and moves away from the Sun with the velocity of about 35 km/s. The velocity with respect to the Milky Way is around −60 km/s implying a slow infall onto the Milky Way. Leo T is classified as a transitional object ('T' in the name) between dwarf spheroidal galaxies (dSph) and dwarf irregular galaxies (dIrr). Its half-light radius is about 180 pc.

Leo T is one of the smallest and faintest galaxies in the Local Group—its integrated luminosity is about 40,000 times that of the Sun (absolute visible magnitude of about −7.1). However, its mass is about 8 million solar masses, which means that Leo's mass to light ratio is around 140. A high mass to light ratio implies that Leo T is dominated by dark matter.

Neutral hydrogen and star formation
The stellar population of Leo T consists of both old and young stars. The old stars probably formed from 12 to 6 billion years ago. The observed old stars are primarily red giants, although a number of horizontal branch stars and red clump stars were also discovered. After a pause star formation activity resumed about 1 billion years ago resulting in a generation of blue young stars. These young stars, which comprise only about 10% of all stellar mass, appear to be more concentrated at the center of Leo T than the old population. Currently there is no star formation in this galaxy.

Leo T contains significant amount of neutral hydrogen (HI) gas with the mass of about 2.8 solar masses, which is three times more than the mass of the stars in this galaxy. The gas includes two main components: cool gas in the center of the galaxy with a temperature of about 500 K and warm gas distributed throughout Leo T with a temperature of 6,000 K. The density of this gas is, however, not enough on average for star formation, which indicates that local processes have a role. Still the presence of hydrogen gas implies that in the future the galaxy will begin forming stars again.

Leo T galaxy may have formed when a small dark matter halo started accretion of gas some time after the reionization epoch. Later this gas gave birth to the first generation of old stars.

Notes

References

Dwarf spheroidal galaxies
4713564
Leo (constellation)
Local Group
Milky Way Subgroup
Astronomical objects discovered in 2006